Sa Re Ga Ma Pa L'il Champs 2019 is an Indian reality television program that premiered on 9 February 2019 and ended on 9 June 2019 on Zee TV. The series, a children's singing competition, was hosted by Ravi Dubey and judged by Amaal Malik, Richa Sharma and Shaan. It was the 7th season of the franchise and was won by 14-year-old Sugandha Date.

Format
Children aged 5 – 15 years participate in a singing competition. In the auditions round, they have 100 seconds to impress the three judges and the 30-members of the grand jury. If two of the three judges say YES and they secure at least 50 per cent of the support of the Grand Jury, then the contestant progresses to the next round.

In the Gala round, the judges select the 'Student of the Week' who is the best performer according to them. The contestant gets to sit on a 'flying sofa', which indicates that the contestant is safe from next week's elimination.

The last episode would be called as Grand finale and would be crowded winner among the top 7 finalists.

Grand jury
There were 30 jurists who score each contestant up to 10 points for the strength of their performance. The contestants' points were averaged, and if any performer receives 100% her/his performance becomes a "Chartbuster Performance". The jurists were:

Grand Jury

Top 16 Contestants
After the "Mega Audition", the show received its top 16 singers, 9 of whom where eliminated in the weeks prior to the finale who are as follows:

Laisel Rai – eliminated on 24 March 2019
Abhiroop Kundu – eliminated on 24 March 2019
Vansh Wadhwa – eliminated on 21 April 2019
Mithila Mali – eliminated on 21 April 2019
Swarnali Acharya – eliminated on 12 May 2019
Aavya Saxena – eliminated on 12 May 2019
Bhavish Mattu – eliminated on 2 June 2019
Pickosa Moharkar – eliminated on 2 June 2019
Ritik Gupta – eliminated on 2 June 2019

Top 7 finalists
The following top seven finalists went on to the grand finale:

Sugandha Date – Winner
Mohammed Faiz – First runner-up
Pritam Acharya – second runner-up
Aayush K.C – Finalist
Anushka Patra – Finalist
Aastha Das – Finalist
Swaransh Tiwari – Finalist

Contestants

Grand finale
In the grand finale the show had 100 piece grand symphony orchestra, a first for Indian television. The show also invited three professional singers:
Kavita Krishnamurthy
Kumar Sanu
Mika Singh

See also
Sa Re Ga Ma Pa
Superstar Singer
The Voice India Kids

References

External links
 Sa Re Ga Ma Pa L'il Champs 2019 Streaming on ZEE5

Hindi-language television shows
Sa Re Ga Ma Pa
2019 Indian television seasons
Zee TV original programming